This is a list of lemonade topics.

Lemonade brands 
 Citrus Hill
 Cottee's
 Country Time
 Del's
 Fruitopia
 Jones Soda
 Leed (soft drink)
 Lemonsoda
 Leninade
 Lorina
 Maine Soft Drinks Ltd
 Mike's Hard Lemonade Co.
 Minute Maid
 R. White's Lemonade
 Woodroofe

Regional varieties 

 Chanh muối
 Leonese lemonade
 Limonada cimarrona
 Limonana
 Papelón con limón
 Shikanjvi

Cocktails and mixed drinks 
 Arnold Palmer (drink)
 John Daly (drink)
 Shandy
 Snowball (cocktail)
 Tom Collins

Other topics 

 Baron von Lemon
 Lemonade stand
 When life gives you lemons, make lemonade
 Lemonade (Beyoncé album)

See also

 List of juices
 List of lemon dishes and beverages
 Preserved lemon
 Lemon-lime drink

External links
 

 
Lists of drinks